Regab (also Romanized as Regāb; also known as Gāb and Rīgāu) is a village in Rudkhaneh Bar Rural District, Rudkhaneh District, Rudan County, Hormozgan Province, Iran. At the 2006 census, its population was 189, in 44 families.

References 

Populated places in Rudan County